The St. John's Maple Leafs were a minor ice hockey team in the American Hockey League. They played in St. John's, Newfoundland and Labrador, Canada, at Memorial Stadium from 1991 to 2001, and at Mile One Stadium from 2001 to 2005. The team was also colloquially known as the "Baby Leafs" after their parent NHL team, the Toronto Maple Leafs.

While the AHL had a strong presence in Atlantic Canada in the 1980s and 1990s, largely due to the desire of several National Hockey League Canadian franchises to continue to pay players sent down to the minors in Canadian dollars, by 2004, St. John's was the last remaining team in the region prior to its relocation to Ontario.

History
The Leafs' AHL franchise was established in Moncton, New Brunswick, in 1978 as the New Brunswick Hawks, where they played until 1982. The franchise had stops in St. Catharines, Ontario, as the St. Catharines Saints (1982–1986) and Newmarket, Ontario, as the Newmarket Saints (1986–1991). The St. John's Maple Leafs were established in 1991 when the Toronto Maple Leafs moved its AHL farm team to St. John's, becoming the first professional ice hockey team in Newfoundland and Labrador.

The team initially played their home games at Memorial Stadium. The St. John's Maple Leafs played their inaugural game on May 8, 1991, in front of a sold-out crowd, where they defeated the Fredericton Canadiens 5–3. The team made it to the Calder Cup finals in their inaugural season, losing a seven game series to the Adirondack Red Wings four-games-to-three. The Leafs were crowned division champions for the 1992–93 and 1996–97 seasons, and won the regular season title during the 1993–94 AHL season.

In 1993, municipal workers for the City of St. John's voted to strike including the city staff operating the St. John's Memorial Stadium. Prior a game in February, the Maple Leafs team arrived at the stadium on a bus, where they were met by a picket line of strikers who then surrounded the bus and began rocking it with the team and personnel on board. Local police were able to intervene, allowing the bus and Maple Leafs to escape unharmed. Following the incident, the Leafs took an extended road trip and the Toronto Maple Leafs threatened to pull the team out of the province. They remained at Memorial Stadium for ten seasons until moving to the newly built Mile One Centre in downtown St. John's in 2001.

The Maple Leafs were a successful team throughout their time in St. John's and made multiple appearances in the AHL Calder Cup playoffs (missing the playoffs in 2000, 2003, and 2004). On April 29, 2005, the Maple Leafs played their final game, losing 4–0 to the Manitoba Moose in game five of the division semifinal round of the playoffs at the MTS Centre in Winnipeg, Manitoba. The Leafs' final home game was a 6–1 victory in game two of the semifinals.

Their 2005 playoff loss marked the end of 34 consecutive seasons of the AHL's presence in Atlantic Canada, which began in 1971 with the Nova Scotia Voyageurs in Halifax, Nova Scotia. In an effort to reduce travel costs, the parent club, ultimately decided to relocate the team to Toronto for the 2005–06 season, where it became known as the Toronto Marlies.

Equipment manager
Shannon (Shaq) Coady was the original stick boy for the St. John's Maple Leafs, after winning a local contest at the age of 14. Coady became the team's equipment manager, and he remained in that role until the team's relocation to Toronto. Coady went on to work for the St. John's Fog Devils of the Quebec Major Junior Hockey League, and the  American Hockey League's St. John's IceCaps. Coady was a well-known figure in NL, due to his work with the province's professional sports teams. Coady died on March 24, 2021, prompting tributes from NHL players and personnel, who had worked with Coady.

Mascot 

The St. John's Maple Leafs' team mascot was a puffin named "Buddy." Buddy wore a Maple Leafs home jersey with the number 92 to commemorate the year he was introduced. The puffin design was selected from a fan contest to create a mascot for the Leafs' second season. Buddy remained the mascot until the team's departure in 2005. Buddy was reintroduced as the mascot for the St. John's IceCaps wearing an IceCaps home jersey with his familiar number of 92. Buddy also served as the mascot for the Newfoundland Growlers of the ECHL. Chris Abbott, the man in the costume, died in St. John's on February 1, 2022.

Media
St. John's Maple Leafs games were broadcast by VOCM news radio, (and by CJYQ in later seasons) and on local television by Cable Atlantic, which was acquired by Rogers Communications in 2001. Brian Rogers was the long-time voice of the St. John's Maple Leafs, after taking over the role from George MacClaren in 1994.

Affiliates
Toronto Maple Leafs (NHL, 1991–2005)
Greensboro Generals (ECHL, 2002–03 season)
Pensacola Ice Pilots (ECHL, 2004–05 season)

Coaches

Marc Crawford (1991–1994)
Tom Watt (1994–1995)
Mike Foligno (1995–1996)
Mark Hunter (1996–1997)
Al MacAdam (1997–2000)
Lou Crawford (2000–2003)
Doug Shedden (2003–2005)

Notable alumni

Kevyn Adams
Jean-Sebastien Aubin
Patrik Augusta
Don Beaupre
Lonny Bohonos
Sebastien Centomo
Rich Chernomaz
Marcel Cousineau
Marc Crawford
Nathan Dempsey
Kelly Fairchild
Brad Leeb
David Ling
Donald MacLean
Ken McRae
Mike Minard
Yanic Perreault
Felix Potvin
Joel Quenneville
Chris Snell
Shawn Thornton
Jimmy Waite
Kyle Wellwood
Brian Wiseman
Bob Wren

Season-by-season results

Regular season

Playoffs

Team Records

Single Season
Goals: 53 - Patrik Augusta (1993–94)
Assists: 74 - Chris Snell (1993–94)
Points: 110 - Rich Chernomaz (1993–94)
Penalty minutes: 354 - Shawn Thornton (1998–99)
GAA (min 25 games): 2.42 - Mike Minard (2000–01)
SV% (min 25 games): .926 - Sebastien Centomo (2001–02)
Shutouts: 6 - Jimmy Waite (1999–2000)

Career
Games: 508 - Nathan Dempsey
Goals: 132 - Yanic Perreault
Assists: 196 - Nathan Dempsey
Points: 276 - Yanic Perreault
Penalty minutes: 1215 - Shawn Thornton
Goaltending wins: 80 - Marcel Cousineau
Shutouts: 7 - Jimmy Waite

References

See also
List of ice hockey teams in Newfoundland and Labrador

 
Maple Leaf Sports & Entertainment
Toronto Maple Leafs minor league affiliates
Ice hockey clubs established in 1991
Ice hockey clubs disestablished in 2005
1991 establishments in Newfoundland and Labrador
2005 disestablishments in Newfoundland and Labrador